Roberto García Orozco (born 24 October 1974) is a Mexican former football referee. He has refereed at the 2014 and 2018 FIFA World Cup qualifiers.

References

1974 births
Living people
Mexican football referees
Copa América referees
People from Mexico City
CONCACAF Gold Cup referees
CONCACAF Champions League referees
21st-century Mexican people